Gustav Severin Henriksen (25 October 1872 – 8 October 1939) was a Norwegian Shipping Executive.

Biography
Henriksen was born at Tune (now Sarpsborg) in Østfold, Norway. He was the son of Christian Henriksen (1829-1886) and Marthe Nielsen (1842-1923).  After the death of his father in 1886, his mother moved the family of Christiania (now Oslo), where he attended trade school. In 1889,  he became an employee
of the Otto Thoresen Shipping Company (1889–1911).
Henriksen was the managing director of the Norwegian America Line (NAL) from its inception in 1911 until his death in 1939.  He also served a long tenure as president of the Norwegian Shipowners' Association.

Personal life
In 1908, he married Lisken Dall (1882–1974). Gustav Henriksen was the father of  lawyer Rein Henriksen and of Hans Christian Henriksen who later served as  chief executive officer of the Norwegian America Line.

References

1872 births
1939 deaths
People from Sarpsborg
Norwegian businesspeople in shipping